Etta is a census-designated place (CDP) in Cherokee County, Oklahoma, United States, within the Cherokee Nation. It was first listed as a CDP prior to the 2020 census.

The CDP is in eastern Cherokee County, on the east bank of the Illinois River, extending from the Baron Fork in the north to downstream from the Etta Bend Public Use Area in the south, by which point the river is impounded as Tenkiller Ferry Lake. The CDP is bordered to the north by Welling, to the east by Caney, and to the southwest by Tenkiller. The CDP is bordered across the Illinois River by Keys to the southwest and Park Hill to the northwest.

Demographics

References 

Census-designated places in Cherokee County, Oklahoma
Census-designated places in Oklahoma